Marchegg is a town in the district of Gänserndorf in the Austrian state of Lower Austria near the Slovak border formed by the Morava River.

Population

Sights

 Castle Marchegg

References

External links

Cities and towns in Gänserndorf District